The 2011 Princeton Tigers football team represented Princeton University in the 2011 NCAA Division I FCS football season. The Tigers were led by second-year head coach Bob Surace and played their home games at Powers Field at Princeton Stadium. They are a member of the Ivy League. They finished the season 1–9 overall and 1–6 in Ivy League play to tie for seventh place. Princeton averaged 7,194 fans per game.

Schedule

References

Princeton
Princeton Tigers football seasons
Princeton Tigers football